Brinsley Butler, 2nd Earl of Lanesborough, PC (Ire) (4 March 1728 – 24 January 1779), styled The Honourable until 1756 and Lord Newtown-Butler from 1756 to 1768, was an Irish politician and peer.

He was the son of Humphrey Butler, 1st Earl of Lanesborough and Mary Berry,  daughter of Richard Berry. He succeeded his father as 2nd Earl of Lanesborough in 1768.

From 1751 until 1768, he was a Member of Parliament (MP), or 'Knight of the Shire', for Cavan County in the Irish House of Commons, and was High Sheriff of Westmeath in 1763. He was educated at Trinity College, Dublin.

As a Freemason, he was Deputy Grand Master of the Grand Lodge of Ireland from 1753 to 1756, and was elected Grand Master in 1757, a post he held until the next year.

Family

He married Lady Jane Rochfort, daughter of Robert Rochfort, 1st Earl of Belvedere and his second wife Mary Molesworth. Their children were :

Robert, 3rd Earl of Lanesborough
Augustus, father of George Butler-Danvers, 5th  Earl of Lanesborough
Mary, who married George Ponsonby, Lord Chancellor of Ireland
Catherine, who married George Marlay, an army officer, only son of George Marlay, Bishop of Dromore
Charlotte, who married Hugh Debbing
Caroline
Sophia, who married Luigi, Marquis Marescotti of Milan.

His widow moved to Italy with her unmarried daughters, and there she gained an unenviable reputation for immorality and extravagance: in 1786 she fled from Naples to avoid being arrested for debt. When her daughter Sophia married a Milanese nobleman, the Marquis Marescotti, Emma, Lady Hamilton asked unkindly if the mother had sold the daughter off to pay her debts. She remarried John King, who had reputedly been her lover for some time, and died in 1828.

Arms

References

1728 births
1779 deaths
Newtown-Butler, Brinsley Butler, Lord
Newtown-Butler, Brinsley Butler, Lord
Politicians from County Cavan
Newtown-Butler, Brinsley Butler, Lord
Members of the Privy Council of Ireland
2